Schaller's mouse shrew (Myosorex schalleri) is a species of mammal in the family Soricidae endemic to the Democratic Republic of Congo.  Its natural habitat is subtropical or tropical moist montane forests.

References

Schaller's mouse shrew
Endemic fauna of the Democratic Republic of the Congo
Schaller's mouse shrew
Taxonomy articles created by Polbot